Palso is a village in Akola district in the state of Maharashtra, India.

About 
Palso is a village 21 kilometres (13 mi) from Akola City. Palso is one of the smaller villages in Akola district with a population of 1456(census 2011).

Villages in Akola district